The 32nd Young Artist Awards ceremony, presented by the Young Artist Association, honored excellence of young performers between the ages of 5 to 21 in the fields of film, television, theater and music for the year 2010, and took place on March 13, 2011 at the Sportsmen's Lodge in Studio City, Los Angeles, California.

Established in 1978 by long-standing Hollywood Foreign Press Association member, Maureen Dragone, the Young Artist Association was the first organization to establish an awards ceremony specifically set to recognize and award the contributions of performers under the age of 21 in the fields of film, television, theater and music.

Categories
★ Bold indicates the winner in each category.

Best Performance in a Feature Film

Best Performance in a Feature Film - Leading Young Actor
★ Jaden Smith - The Karate Kid - Columbia Pictures
Noah Ringer - The Last Airbender - Paramount Pictures
Zachary Gordon - Diary of a Wimpy Kid - 20th Century Fox
Eros Vlahos - Nanny McPhee and the Big Bang - Universal Pictures

Best Performance in a Feature Film - Leading Young Actress
★ Hailee Steinfeld - True Grit - Paramount Pictures
Chloë Grace Moretz - Kick-Ass - Universal Pictures
Delanie Armstrong - Lavanderia - Stauros Entertainment
Jennifer Lawrence - Winter's Bone - Roadside Attractions
Elle Fanning - The Nutcracker in 3D - Free Style Releasing

Best Performance in a Feature Film - Leading Young Actress Ten and Under
★ Joey King - Ramona and Beezus - 20th Century Fox
Bailee Madison - An Invisible Sign - Kimmel International
Kiernan Shipka - Cats & Dogs: The Revenge of Kitty Galore - Warner Brothers

Best Performance in a Feature Film - Supporting Young Actor
★ Billy Unger - You Again - Touchstone Pictures
Robert Capron - Diary of a Wimpy Kid - Twentieth Century Fox
Alexander Conti - Case 39 - Paramount Vantage
Chase Ellison - Tooth Fairy - Twentieth Century Fox
Alex Ferris - Diary of a Wimpy Kid - Twentieth Century Fox
Quinton Lopez - Dark House - Lightning Media II
Dylan Minnette - Let Me In - Relativity Media
Frankie McLaren - Hereafter - Warner Bros. Pictures
George McLaren - Hereafter - Warner Bros. Pictures

Best Performance in a Feature Film - Supporting Young Actress
★ (tie) Diandra Newlin - Dreamkiller - Delaware Pictures
★ (tie) Stefanie Scott - Flipped - Warner Bros. Pictures
Seychelle Gabriel - The Last Airbender - Paramount Pictures
Courtney Robinson - Dark House - Lightning Media II
Laine MacNeil - Diary of a Wimpy Kid - Twentieth Century Fox
Ada-Nicole Sanger - Grown Ups - Columbia Pictures

Best Performance in a Feature Film - Supporting Young Actor Ten and Under
★ Colin Baiocchi - Little Fockers - Universal Pictures
Chandler Canterbury - After.Life - Anchor Bay Films
Preston Bailey - The Crazies - Overture Films
Michael William Arnold - My Name is Khan - Twentieth Century Fox
Ryan Ketzner - Flipped - Warner Bros. Pictures

Best Performance in a Feature Film - Supporting Young Actress Ten and Under
★ Melody Choi - Gunless - Alliance Films
Faith Wladyka - Blue Valentine - The Weinstein Company
Simone Lopez - Mother and Child - Sony Pictures Classic
Destiny Whitlock - Tooth Fairy - Twentieth Century Fox

Best Performance in a Feature Film - Young Ensemble Cast
★ Diary of a Wimpy Kid - Twentieth Century Fox Film CorporationZachary Gordon, Robert Capron, Devon Bostick, Alex Ferris, Karan Brar, Chloë Grace Moretz, Laine MacNeil and Grayson Russell 
The Chronicles of Narnia: The Voyage of the Dawn Treader - Twentieth Century Fox Film Corporation
Georgie Henley, Skander Keynes and Will Poulter
Let Me In - Overture Films
Kodi Smit-McPhee, Chloë Grace Moretz, Dylan Minnette and Jimmy "Jax" Pinchak

Best Performance in an International Feature Film
Best Performance in an International Feature Film - Leading Young Performer
★ (tie) Robert Naylor - 10½ - Canada (French)★ (tie) Teymur Odushev - The Precinct - AzerbaijanDenis Sukhomlinov - The Rowan Waltz - Russia
Leo Legrand - A Distant Neighborhood - France
Bill Skarsgård - Simple Simon - Sweden
Roger Príncep - Paper Birds - Spain
Keitumetse Matlabo - Tirza - The Netherlands
Felipe Falanga - Lula, The Son of Brasil - Brazil

Best Performance in a Short Film
Best Performance in a Short Film - Young Actor
★ Andy Scott Harris - Alone - Independent
Tyler Shamy - World of Lines - Mighty 8
Justin Tinucci - Stanley - Independent
Brennan Bailey - Adalyn - Independent
LJ Benet - The Legend of Beaver Dam - Independent
Brandon Tyler Russell - Wurm - Independent
Joey Luthman - Mad Dog and the Flyboy - Independent
Austin Coleman - Tent City - ITVS

Best Performance in a Short Film - Young Actress
★ Katlin Mastandrea - Make Believer - Independent
Rylie Beaty - Adalyn - Independent
Christina Robinson - Equestrian Sexual Response - American Film Institute
Sydney Sweeney - Takeo - American Film Institute

Best Performance in a Short Film - Young Actor Ten and Under
★ Dawson Dunbar - Little Big Kid - Independent
Kyle Agnew - Suburban Superhero - Independent
Kai Kennedy - Birth Day - Independent
Matthew Jacob Wayne - Wurm - Independent

Best Performance in a Short Film - Young Actress Ten and Under
★ Kaitlin Cheung - The Perfect Gift for Flora - Independent
Chelsey Valentine - Birthday - Independent
Dalila Bela - Kids Court - Independent
Maggie Jones - The Party - Independent
Caitlin Carmichael - The Mis-Informant - Independent
Melody Choi - Kids Court - Independent
Ashley Switzer - One For You And One For Me - Independent
Ashley Nicole Greene - To Wander in Pandemonium - 

Best Performance in a TV Movie, Miniseries or Special
Best Performance in a TV Movie, Miniseries or Special - Leading Young Actor
★ Brennan Bailey - The Dog Who Saved Christmas Vacation - Stars Home Entertainment
Chase Ellison - The Boy Who Cried Werewolf - Nickelodeon Network
Michael Arnold - The Dog Who Saved Christmas Vacation - Stars Home Entertainment
John Fleming - Cancel Christmas - The Hallmark Channel
Gage Munroe - The Night Before the Night Before Christmas - The Hallmark Channel

Best Performance in a TV Movie, Miniseries or Special - Leading Young Actress
★ Mia Ford - Within - Bigfoot Entertainment
Victoria Justice - The Boy Who Cried Werewolf - Nickelodeon
Debby Ryan - 16 Wishes - The Disney Channel
Madisen Beaty - The Pregnancy Pact - The Lifetime Channel
Morgan Lily - Love's Everlasting Courage - The Hallmark Channel

Best Performance in a TV Movie, Miniseries or Special - Supporting Young Actor
★ Cainan Wiebe - 16 Wishes - The Disney Channel
Alexander Conti - Harriet the Spy: Blog Wars - The Disney Channel
Max Ehrich - The Pregnancy Pact - Lifetime Television
Tate Berney - Farewell Mr. Kringle - RHI Entertainment
Joey Pollari - Avalon High - The Disney Channel
Ty Wood - Keep Your Head Up, Kid: The Don Cherry Story - CBS Television

Best Performance in a TV Movie, Miniseries or Special - Supporting Young Actress
★ Olivia Steele-Falconer - The Client List - Lifetime Television
Chloe Madison - Amish Grace - Lifetime Movie Network
Lauren Delfs - Las Tundas of the Valley - Web Series
Kelly Heyer - The Pregnancy Pact - Lifetime Television
Brianna Daguanno - The Santa Suit - The Hallmark Channel

Best Performance in a TV Series
Best Performance in a TV Series (Comedy or Drama) - Leading Young Actor
★ Benjamin Stockham - Sons of Tucson - Twentieth Century Fox TV
Jesse Camacho - Less Than Kind - Break Through Ent.
Jacob Kraemer - Overruled! - The Disney Channel
Dylan Everett - Wingin' It - The Family Channel
Jason Spevack - Dino Dan - Nickelodeon Productions 
Daniel Curtis Lee - Zeke and Luther - Disney XD

Best Performance in a TV Series (Comedy or Drama) - Leading Young Actress
★ Bella Thorne - Shake It Up - The Disney Channel
Ryan Newman - Zeke and Luther - Disney XD
Miranda Cosgrove - iCarly - Nickelodeon
Keke Palmer - True Jackson, VP - Nickelodeon

Best Performance in a TV Series (Comedy or Drama) - Supporting Young Actor
★ Coy Stewart - Are We There Yet? - TBS
Braeden Lemasters - Men of a Certain Age - TNT
Graham Phillips - The Good Wife - CBS
Bradley Steven Perry - Good Luck Charlie - Disney Channel

Best Performance in a TV Series (Comedy or Drama) - Supporting Young Actress
★ Teala Dunn - Are We There Yet? - TBS
Brittany Curran - Men of a Certain Age - TNT
Hannah Hodson - Hawthorne - TNT
Kiernan Shipka - Mad Men - AMC
Kathryn Newton - Gary Unmarried - CBS
Makenzie Vega - The Good Wife - CBS

Best Performance in a TV Series - Guest Starring Young Actor 18-21
★ Andrew Jenkins - Tower Prep - The Cartoon Network
Hutch Dano - Law & Order: LA - NBC
Thomas Kasp - Big Time Rush - Nickelodeon
Austin Butler - The Defenders - CBS

Best Performance in a TV Series - Guest Starring Young Actress 16-21
★ Katlin Mastandrea - Criminal Minds - CBS
Erin Sanders - Big Time Rush - Nickelodeon
Katelyn Pacitto - I'm in the Band - Disney Channel

Best Performance in a TV Series - Guest Starring Young Actor 14-17
★ Dylan Minnette - Medium - CBS
Gig Morton - Shattered (ep: "Where's the Line?") - E1 Entertainment
Joey Luthman - Ghost Whisperer - CBS
Ricardo Hoyos - Haven - Syfy
Billy Unger - Ghost Whisperer - CBS
Sterling Beaumon - Criminal Minds - CBS
Brandon Soo Hoo - Community - NBC

Best Performance in a TV Series - Guest Starring Young Actor 11-13
★ (tie) Zayne Emory - I'm in the Band - Disney Channel
★ (tie) Aaron Refvem - CSI: NY - CBS
David Gore - Psych - USA Network
David Burrus - Hannah Montana - Disney Channel
Adom Osei - Supernatural - CW
Michael Ketzner - Criminal Minds - CBS
Nathan Cheung - Untold Stories of the E.R. - TLC
Colin Ford - CSI: Miami - CBS

Best Performance in a TV Series - Guest Starring Young Actress 11-15
★ Madisen Beaty - NCIS: Naval Criminal Investigative Service - CBS
Ryan Newman - Good Luck Charlie - Disney Channel
Bella King - Smallville - WB Network
Katherine Bralower - Primetime: What Would You Do? - ABC
Callie Thompson - House, M.D. - FOX
Sadie Calvano - NCIS: Naval Criminal Investigative Service - CBS
Kaitlyn Dever - Private Practice - ABC
Bella Thorne - Wizards of Waverly Place - Disney Channel
Madison Leisle - Criminal Minds - CBS
Kelly Heyer - The Middle - ABC
Sydney Sweeney - Chase - NBC

Best Performance in a TV Series - Guest Starring Young Actor Ten and Under
★ (tie) Parker Contreras - The Middle - ABC
★ (tie) Tucker Albrizzi - Good Luck Charlie - The Disney Channel
Preston Bailey - Cold Case - CBS
Jacob Ewaniuk - Rookie Blue - ABC
Mason Cook - The Middle - ABC
Riley Thomas Stewart - How I Met Your Mother - 20th Century Television
Quinn Lord - Fringe - The WB Network

Best Performance in a TV Series - Guest Starring Young Actress Ten and Under
★ Samantha Bailey - Ghost Whisperer - CBS
Joey King - Ghost Whisperer - CBS
Olivia Steele-Falconer - Smallville - WB Network
Sierra Pitkin - Fringe - WB Network
Nikki Hahn - The Closer - TNT
Bobbie Prewitt - Chase - WB Network
Sophia Ewaniuk - Flashpoint - CTV
Ashley Switzer - iCarly - Nickelodeon

Best Performance in a TV Series - Recurring Young Actor
★ Brock Ciarlelli - The Middle - ABC
David Gore - Zeke and Luther - Disney XD
Dylan Minnette - Lost - ABC
Ricardo Hoyos - Dino Dan - Nickelodeon
Austin MacDonald - Living in Your Car - Movie Central Network
Quinton Lopez - The Closer - TNT
A.J. Saudin - Degrassi: The Next Generation - CTV

Best Performance in a TV Series - Recurring Young Actress 17-21
★ Erin Sanders - Big Time Rush - Nickelodeon
Blaine Saunders - The Middle - ABC
Abigail Mavity - Zeke and Luther - Disney XD

Best Performance in a TV Series - Recurring Young Actress 11-16
★ Isabella Murad - Criminal Minds - ABC
Bella Thorne - Big Love - HBO
Christina Robinson - Dexter - Showtime
Keana Bastidas - Dino Dan - Nickelodeon
Hannah Marks - FlashForward - ABC
Jaclyn Forbes - Dino Dan Nickelodeon
Kelly Heyer - Raising Hope - FOX

Best Performance in a TV Series - Recurring Young Actor Ten and Under
★ Connor Gibbs - Ghost Whisperer - CBS
Edward Sass III - The Daily Show with Jon Stewart - Comedy Central
Preston Bailey - Dexter - Showtime
Tucker Albrizzi - Big Time Rush - Nickelodeon
Drew Davis - Rookie Blue - ABC

Best Performance in a TV Series - Recurring Young Actress Ten and Under
★ Mackenzie Aladjem - Nurse Jackie - Showtime
Mary-Charles Jones - Hannah Montana - Disney Channel
Sophia Ewaniuk - Happy Town - ABC
Sydney Kuhne - Dino Dan - Nickelodeon
Ava Allan - True Jackson, VP - Nickelodeon
Hailey Sole - Private Practice - ABC

Best Performance in a Daytime TV Series - Young Actor
★ Mick Hazen - As the World Turns - CBS
Field Cate - The Young and the Restless - CBS
Dylan Patton - Days of Our Lives - NBC

Best Performance in a Daytime TV Series - Young Actress
★ Lexi Ainsworth - General Hospital - ABC
Taylor Spreitler - Days of Our Lives - NBC
Gabriela Rodriguez - Days of Our Lives - NBC

Best Performance in a Daytime TV Series - Young Actor 12 and Under
★ Tate Berney - All My Children - ABC
Jake Vaughn - All My Children - ABC
Aaron Sanders - General Hospital - ABC

Best Performance in a Daytime TV Series - Young Actress Ten and Under
★ Haley Pullos - General Hospital - ABC
Mackenzie Aladjem - All My Children - ABC
Danielle Parker - All My Children - ABC
Lauren Boles - Days of Our Lives - NBC

Outstanding Young Ensemble in a TV Series
★ Dino Dan - Nickelodeon
Jason Spevack, Sydney Kuhne, Isaac Durnford, Jaclyn Forbes and Ricardo HoyosModern Family - ABC
Rico Rodriguez II, Nolan Gould and Ariel WinterShake It Up - Disney Channel
Bella Thorne, Zendaya, Davis Cleveland, Adam Irigoyen, Roshon Fegan, Caroline Sunshine and Kenton DutyThe Middle - ABC
Charlie McDermott, Eden Sher and Atticus Shaffer

Best Performance in a Voice-Over Role
Best Performance in a Voice-Over Role - Young Actor
★ Regan Mizrahi - Dora the Explorer - Nickelodeon
Jacob Ewaniuk - The Cat in the Hat Knows a Lot About That! - PBS
Dallas Jokic - Babar and the Adventures of Badou - Nelvana

Best Performance in a Voice-Over Role - Young Actress
★ Jordan Van Vranken - Chadam - Warner Brothers TV
Erika-Shaye Gair - Dinosaur Train - Jim Henson Company
Alexa Torrington - The Cat in the Hat Knows a Lot About That! - PBS

Best Performance in a DVD Film
Best Performance in a DVD Film - Young Actor
★ Colin Ford - Jack and the Beanstalk - Avalon Family Entertainment
Randy Shelly - Kid Racer - Sterling Entertainment
Justin Marco - Kid Racer - Sterling Entertainment
Nic Puehse - Nic & Tristan Go Mega Dega - Phase 4 Films
Tristan Puehse - Nic & Tristan Go Mega Dega - Phase 4 Films

Best Performance in a DVD Film - Young Actress
★ Dalila Bela - The Stranger - Anchor Bay Entertainment
Isabella Astor - Kid Racer - Sterling Entertainment
Danielle Chuchran - You're So Cupid! - Gravitas Ventures
Melody Choi - The Search for Santa Paws - Walt Disney Pictures
Michelle LaBret - The Gold Retrievers - Alpine Pictures
Caitlin EJ Meyer - You're So Cupid! - Gravitas Ventures
Sierra Pitkin - The Traveler - Paramount Pictures

Best Performance in Live Theater
Best Performance in Live Theater - Young Actor
★ Alphonso Romero Jones II - The Lion King
Quinton Lopez - SickAdam Riegler - The Addams FamilyMarquis Kofi Rodriquez - The Lion KingBest Performance in Live Theater - Young Actress
★ (tie) Eden Sanaa Duncan Smith - August Wilson's Fences
★ (tie) Evie Louise Thompson - Yellow
Rebecca Simpson Wallack - Peter PanMelody Hollis - AnnieJolie Vanier - Nifty-FiftiesSpecial awards
Most Promising International Entertainer
★ Zulfat Gabdulin (Зульфат Габдулин), Kazan, Republic of Tatarstan – Singer / Entertainer – Без булдырабыз! (We Can!)

Outstanding Instrumentalist
★ Ethan Bortnick – Pianist / Composer / Actor / Artist

Mickey Rooney Award
★ Mario Lopez – Actor / Entertainer Extraordinaire

Jackie Coogan Award
Contribution to Youth Through Entertainment
★ Waiting for "Superman" – Documentary – ParamountMichael Landon Award
★ Huell Howser – California's Gold – PBSSocial Relations of Knowledge Institute Award
★ 'Modern Marvels – The History Channel'''

References

External links
Official site
 32nd Annual Young Artist Awards photographs at LIFE.com
 32nd Annual Young Artist Awards red carpet arrivals at MaximoTV.com

Young Artist Awards ceremonies
2010 film awards
2010 television awards
2011 in American cinema
2011 in American television
2011 in California